The 2005 NBA All-Star Game was an exhibition basketball game which was played on February 20, 2005, at Pepsi Center in Denver, home of the Denver Nuggets. This game was the 54th edition of the North American National Basketball Association (NBA) All-Star Game and was played during the 2004–05 NBA season.

For the second time in the last six years, the East defeated the West 125–115, with Allen Iverson of the Philadelphia 76ers named the Most Valuable Player. Iverson scored 15 points, handed out 10 assists, and had 5 steals. Ray Allen led the West with 17, and 5-for-11 from three-point range.

All-Star Game

Coaches

The coaches for the All-Star game were the head coaches who led the teams with the best winning percentages in their conference through the games of February 6, 2005. The coach for the Western Conference team was San Antonio Spurs head coach Gregg Popovich. The Spurs had a 41–12 record on February 20. The coach for the Eastern Conference team was Miami Heat head coach Stan Van Gundy. The Heat had a 40–14 record on February 20.

Players

The rosters for the All-Star Game were chosen in two ways. The starters were chosen via a fan ballot. Two guards, two forwards and one center who received the highest vote were named the All-Star starters. The reserves were chosen by votes among the NBA head coaches in their respective conferences. The coaches were not permitted to vote for their own players. The reserves consist of two guards, two forwards, one center and two players regardless of position. If a player is unable to participate due to injury, the commissioner will select a replacement.

The 2005 NBA All-Star introduced international players who became superstars. Amongst the players selected were: Žydrūnas Ilgauskas (Lithuania), Manu Ginóbili (Argentina), Steve Nash (Canada), Dirk Nowitzki (Germany) along with voted-starters Tim Duncan (U.S. Virgin Islands) and Yao Ming (China). This game tied the 2003 and 2004 All-Star Game record for the most international All-Stars in one year.

Yao Ming of the Houston Rockets led the ballots with 2,558,578 votes, which earned him a starting position in the Western Conference team for the third year in a row. Tracy McGrady, Kobe Bryant, Kevin Garnett, and Duncan completed the Western Conference starting positions. This was also the same starting line-up as the previous year, with the exception that McGrady started for the East. The Western Conference reserves included three first-time selections, Ginobili of the San Antonio Spurs, Amar'e Stoudemire of the Phoenix Suns, and Rashard Lewis of the Seattle SuperSonics. The team was rounded out by Nash, Nowitzki, Ray Allen, and Shawn Marion. The Phoenix Suns had three representations at the All-Star Game (Marion, Stoudemire, Nash), while two other teams, Houston Rockets, and San Antonio Spurs, had two representations with McGrady/Yao, and Duncan/Ginobili.

After being traded to the Eastern Conference's Miami Heat, Shaquille O'Neal led the East ballots with 2,488,089 votes. This would be O'Neal's twelfth appearance as an All-Star. Allen Iverson, Vince Carter, LeBron James, and Grant Hill completed the Eastern Conference starting position. This was James' first All-Star appearance. The Eastern Conference reserves included three first-time selections, Dwyane Wade, Gilbert Arenas, and Antawn Jamison. Ilgauskas, Ben Wallace, Jermaine O'Neal, and Paul Pierce rounded out the team. Three teams, Cleveland Cavaliers, Miami Heat, and Washington Wizards, had two representations at the All-Star Game with James/Ilgauskas, O'Neal/Wade, and Arenas/Jamison.

Roster

Game

All-Star Weekend

Slam Dunk Contest

Three-Point Contest

References

External links
 2005 NBA All-Star Game

NBA All All-Star Game
National Basketball Association All-Star Game
All-Star
Basketball competitions in Denver
2000s in Denver